The 2013 Women's LEN Super Cup was the 8th edition of the Women's LEN Super Cup an annual water polo match organized by the LEN and contested by the reigning champions of the two main European club competitions.

The match was played between the Euro League Champion (CN Sabadell) and the LEN Trophy Runners-up (SKIF Izmailovo) in Moscow on December 7, 2013.

Match

 Time is MSK (UTC+3).

Squads

CN Sabadell Astralpool

Head coach: Ignasi Guiu

References

Women's LEN Super Cup
2013 in water polo